Cheung Pei Shan Road is a road near Cheung Pei Shan in Tsuen Wan and Sheung Kwai Chung of Hong Kong. It links the north edge of town centre of Tsuen Wan New Town to Shing Mun, from Tsuen Kam Interchange with Route Twisk, Tai Ho Road North, Wai Tsuen Road and Texaco Road North to the entrance of the Shing Mun Tunnels. The road is part of Route 9. North of the road are resited villages from the old town of Tsuen Wan and Cheung Pei Shan; to its south are public housing estates: Lei Muk Shue Estate, Cheung Shan Estate and Shek Wai Kok Estate.

History
Cheung Pei Shan Road was opened in July 1980 to provide access to Cheung Shan Estate and Shek Wai Kok Estate. At that time, the road was directly connected to Wo Yi Hop Road at its east end. In 1990, the Shing Mun Tunnels were completed, and the east end of Cheung Pei Shan Road was realigned to connect directly to the west entrance of the tunnels. Connection to Wo Yi Hop Road was cut.

In September 2001, construction was started on an extension of Cheung Pei Shan Road from Tsuen Kam Interchange to the Tsuen Wan end of Tuen Mun Road. This extension was opened on 8 February 2007, closing the gap of the New Territories Circular Road.

Interchanges

References

See also
List of streets and roads in Hong Kong
Route 9 (Hong Kong)

Roads in the New Territories
Route 9 (Hong Kong)
Tsuen Wan
Extra areas operated by NT taxis